The Swiss National Museum—part of the Musée Suisse Group, itself affiliated with the Federal Office of Culture, is located in the city of Zurich, Switzerland's largest city, next to the Hauptbahnhof.

The museum building of 1898 in the historicist style was built by Gustav Gull in the form of the French Renaissance city chateaus. His impressive architecture with dozens of towers, courts and his astonishing park on a peninsula between the rivers Sihl and Limmat has become one of the main sights of the Old City District of Zurich. Its inauguration was filmed by François-Henri Lavanchy-Clarke, the first non-french concessionary of the Lumière brothers.

The exhibition tour takes the visitor from prehistory through ancient times and the Middle Ages to the 20th century (classic modern art and art of the 16th, 17th and 18th century is settled mainly in the Kunsthaus Museum in a different part of the city of Zurich). There is a very rich section with gothic art, chivalry and a comprehensive collection of liturgical wooden sculptures, panel paintings and carved altars. Zunfthaus zur Meisen near Fraumünster church houses the porcelain and faience collection of the Swiss National Museum. There are also: a Collections Gallery, a place where there are Swiss furnishings being exhibited, an Armoury Tower, a diorama of the Battle of Murten, and a Coin Cabinet showing 14th, 15th, 16th century Swiss coins and even some coins from the Middle Ages.

The boats of the Zürichsee-Schifffahrtsgesellschaft start their round trips (Swiss National Museum–Wollishofen–Zürichhorn) on the Limmat through the city of Zürich at the Swiss National Museum.

References

External links 

 National Museum Zurich
What the Swiss National Museum in Zurich is all about

Museums established in 1890
Cultural infrastructure completed in 1898
National museums of Switzerland
Art museums and galleries in Switzerland
Altstadt (Zürich)
Museums in Zürich
National Museum
Cultural property of national significance in the canton of Zürich
History museums in Switzerland
Decorative arts museums
Numismatic museums in Switzerland
Military and war museums in Switzerland
19th-century architecture in Switzerland